India first participated at the Olympic Games in 1900, with a lone athlete Norman Pritchard winning two medals – both silver – in athletics and became the first Asian nation to win an Olympic medal. The nation first sent a team to the Summer Olympic Games in 1920 and has participated in every Summer Games since then. India has also competed at several Winter Olympic Games beginning in 1964. Indian athletes have won 35 medals, all at the Summer Games. For a period of time, the Indian Men's Field Hockey Team was dominant in Olympic competition, winning eleven medals in twelve Olympics between 1928 and 1980. The run included eight gold medals of which six were won consecutively from 1928 to 1956.

History

During British Imperial rule 
 

Despite being under British rule until 1947, India participated in the Olympic Games separately from the British Olympic Team. India sent its first athlete to the Summer Olympics for the 1900 Games, but an Indian national team did not compete at the Summer Olympics until 1920. Ahead of the 1920 Games, Sir Dorabji Tata and Governor of Bombay George Lloyd helped India secure representation at the International Olympic Committee, enabling it to participate in the Games (see India at the 1920 Olympic Games). India then sent a team to the 1920 Olympics, comprising three athletes, two wrestlers, and managers Sohrab Bhoot and A. H. A. Fyzee. The Indian Olympic movement was then established during the 1920s: some founders of this movement were Dorabji Tata, A.G. Noehren (Madras College of Physical Education), H.C. Buck (Madras College of Physical Education), Moinul Haq (Bihar sports associations), S. Bhoot (Bombay Olympic Association), A.S. Bhagwat (Deccan Gymkhana), and Guru Dutt Sondhi (Punjab Olympic Association); Lt. Col H.L.O. Garrett (from the Government College Lahore and Punjab Olympic Association) and Sagnik Poddar (of St. Stephen's School) helped organise some early national games; and prominent patrons included Maharajas and royal princes such as Bhupinder Singh of Patiala, Ranjitsinhji of Nawanagar, the Maharaja of Kapurthala, and the Maharaja of Burdwan.

In 1923, a provisional All India Olympic Committee was formed, and in February 1924, the All India Olympic Games (that later became the National Games of India) were held to select a team for the 1924 Summer Olympics. The Indian delegation at the Paris Olympics comprised seven athletes, seven tennis players and team manager Harry Buck.

In 1927, the provisional Indian Olympic Committee formally became the Indian Olympic Association (IOA); its main tasks were to promote the development of sports in India, choose host cities for the national games, and send teams selected from the national games to the Summer Olympics. Thus, at the 1928 national games, it selected seven athletes to represent India at the next Summer Olympics, with Sondhi as manager. By this time, the Indian Hockey Federation (IHF) had also been established and it sent a hockey team to the Summer Olympics. The national hockey team was similarly sent to the 1932 Games along with four athletes and one swimmer and 1936 Games with four athletes, three wrestlers, one weight-lifter, along with three officials headed by team manager Sondhi. The Indian field hockey team dominated the Olympics from 1928 to 1936 winning an unprecedented three consecutive titles. In the 1928 Summer Olympics final India defeated Netherlands 3–0. It was the first gold medal won by any nation from Asia at the modern Olympic Games. In 1932 Summer Olympics India defeated United States 24–1, the largest margin of victory in Olympics history. In 1936 Summer Olympics final they defeated Germany 8–1, the largest margin of victory ever in an Olympic final.

Post-independence 

From 1948 onwards, because of the IOA's wider outreach, India began sending delegations of over 50 athletes in several sports, each selected by its sports federation, to the Summer Olympics. The delegation was headed by a chef-de-mission. The Indian field hockey team won a gold medal at the 1948 Summer Olympics by defeating Great Britain in the final. It was the first gold medal for India as an independent nation.

At the 1952 Summer Olympics wrestler K. D. Jadhav won the first individual medal for independent India. The Indian field hockey team continued their dominance by winning a sixth straight title by defeating Pakistan in the final of 1956 Summer Olympics. The six straight title wins by the Indian team was an Olympic record at that time in a team event. This record has since been surpassed only by the United States men's and  women's basketball teams.

At the 1960 Rome Olympics the hockey team lost the final and had to settle for a silver medal. The team bounced back by winning gold at the 1964 Summer Olympics. But went on to win only bronze medals in the next two Olympics.India sent a delegation to compete at the 1964 Winter Olympics in Innsbruck, Austria. This was India's debut at the Winter Olympic Games. The sole athlete representing India was Jeremy Bujakowski, who competed in the men's downhill event in alpine skiing. In 1976 Summer Olympics India went home empty handed, the first time since 1924.

Indian hockey team won their record eighth Olympic gold at the 1980 Summer Olympics. India had to return empty handed in the next three Summer Olympics. At the 1996 Summer Olympics held in Atlanta, tennis player Leander Paes won a bronze medal at the men's singles event ending a barren run of 16 years without a medal at the Olympics and also became the first individual medalist since 1952.

Recent history 

At the 2000 Sydney Olympics, Karnam Malleswari won a bronze medal in the Women's 69 kg weightlifting category. It was the first-ever Olympic medal won by an Indian woman. 

At the 2004 Athens Olympics, star shooter Rajyavardhan Singh Rathore won the silver medal in Men's double trap shooting.

At the 2008 Beijing Olympics, Abhinav Bindra won gold in the Men's 10 metre air rifle event becoming the first Indian to win an individual gold medal at the Olympic Games. Vijender Singh got the country's first medal in boxing with his bronze medal in Middleweight category. The 3 medal haul for India was the best till that year. Subsequently, the record was bettered to make it the third best performance in history.

The 2012 Summer Olympics saw a record 83-member Indian contingent participating in the games and setting a new best for the country with a total of six medals. Wrestler Sushil Kumar became the first Indian with multiple individual Olympic medals (bronze at the 2008 Summer Olympics and silver at the 2012 Summer Olympics) since independence. Saina Nehwal won a bronze medal in badminton in Women's singles, winning the country's first Olympic medal in badminton. Pugilist Mary Kom became the first Indian woman to win a medal in boxing with her bronze medal in Women's flyweight division. Star shooter Gagan Narang won the bronze in men's 10 m air rifle shooting. Vijay Kumar added another medal by winning a silver in men's 25 m rapid fire pistol competition.This was India's best performance till it was overtaken in 2020.

At the 2016 Summer Olympics, a record number of 118 athletes competed. Sakshi Malik became the first Indian female wrestler to win an Olympic medal with her bronze medal in the Women's freestyle 58 kg category. Shuttler P. V. Sindhu won a silver medal in Women's singles badminton, becoming the first Indian woman to win an Olympic silver medal and also the youngest Indian Olympic medalist.

At the 2020 Summer Olympics (held in 2021), India was represented by a new record number of 124 athletes. Saikhom Mirabai Chanu secured a silver in the weightlifting women's category of 49 kg on the opening day, the first time India won a medal on the opening day of any Olympics. A few days later, P. V. Sindhu defeated China's He Bingjiao in the Women's singles badminton bronze-medal match in straight games, thus becoming the first Indian woman to win two individual Olympic medals. Neeraj Chopra won the gold in Javelin Throw, becoming the first Indian to win a gold medal in track and field and the second Indian to win an individual Olympic gold. In Men's Field Hockey, India won a bronze medal. This medal came after a gap of 41 years, having last won a gold medal in Moscow 1980. In the wrestling competitions, Ravi Kumar Dahiya won a silver medal and Bajrang Punia won a bronze medal. Olympic debutant Lovlina Borgohain took bronze in women's boxing. She became only the second woman to win an Olympic medal in boxing. The haul of 7 medals is the best performance for India in the Olympics history.

Olympic Milestones

Indian contingent at Olympics 
Following lists provide a comparative compendium of the number of participants from India in the Summer and Winter Olympic Games.

Participation in Summer Games

Participation in Winter Games

Medal tables

Medals by Summer Games

Medals by Winter Games 

 A total of 3 athletes qualified from India but Shiva Keshavan had to participate as an Independent Olympic Participant due to an ongoing suspension of Indian Olympic Association which was reinstated during the course of 2014 Games.

Medals by Sports

Summer

List of medalists

Multiple medalists

Team sports

Individual Sports

Indian men's field hockey team at the Summer Olympics

Olympic records 

Most matches played : 134
Most wins : 83
Most goals scored : 458
Least goals conceded in a single tournament: 0,  & , Men's tournament
Biggest winning streak : 30–0,  – , Men's tournament
Most goals scored in a single tournament : 43, Men's tournament
Most back-to-back titles : 6  Gold medals,  – , Men's tournament
Most consecutive medals won : 10 medals, (7  Gold, 1  Silver, 2  Bronze),  – , Men's tournament
Most appearances in total : 21
Most consecutive appearances : 18,  – , Men's tournament
Most titles won : 8  Gold medals
Most medals won : 12 (8  Gold, 1  Silver, 3  Bronze), Men's tournament

Medal table

See also 

 Sport in India

List of flag bearers for India at the Olympics
India at the Paralympics
India at the World Games
India at the Asian Games
India at the Commonwealth Games
India at the Lusofonia Games
India at the South Asian Games
Olympic Gold Quest

References

External links 
 
 
 

India at the Olympics
History of sport in India